Pycnarrhena is a genus of flowering plants belonging to the family Menispermaceae.

Its native range is Tropical and Subtropical Asia.

Species:

Pycnarrhena insignis 
Pycnarrhena longifolia 
Pycnarrhena lucida 
Pycnarrhena manillensis 
Pycnarrhena montana 
Pycnarrhena novoguineensis 
Pycnarrhena ozantha 
Pycnarrhena pleniflora 
Pycnarrhena poilanei 
Pycnarrhena tumefacta

References

Menispermaceae
Menispermaceae genera